This is a list of notable Mauritian models.

Female models 

 Danika Atchia
 Viveka Babajee
 Diya Beeltah
 Laetitia Darche
 Ameeksha Dilchand
 Hazel Keech
 Nathalie Lesage
 Urvashi Gooriah

See also

 List of Mauritians

Models
Maurtian